Jesús Manuel Corona Ruíz (born 6 January 1993), popularly known by his nickname Tecatito, is a Mexican professional footballer who plays as a winger for La Liga club Sevilla and the Mexico national team.

Tecatito began his career in 2010 with Monterrey, playing with the club for three years before moving abroad. He transferred to Dutch club FC Twente and played with its reserve team as well. He joined Porto in 2015, garnering 287 appearances and winning three Primeira Liga titles in his seven seasons with the club.

A full international since 2014, Tecatito was part of the national squad that won the 2015 CONCACAF Gold Cup. He has also represented his country at the 2018 FIFA World Cup, the 2021 Gold Cup, and at two Copa América tournaments.

Club career

Monterrey

Born to a lower-middle-class family in Hermosillo, Sonora, Corona began playing football at the age of 6 for various local youth teams. At the age of 15, he was scouted by a number of clubs, including Brazilian side Santos FC, however due to his family's reluctance to see him move abroad at such a young age, Corona eventually began his professional career by joining C.F. Monterrey.

Corona made his senior team debut at 17 years old, under coach Víctor Manuel Vucetich, on 7 August 2010 as a starter in an away league match against Atlante in a 2–1 victory for Monterrey. He scored his first goal for Monterrey on 7 October 2011 in an away match against Tecos, with the game ending in a 3–2 victory for Monterrey. Corona also scored his first goal for Monterrey in their presentation at the 2012 FIFA Club World Cup against Ulsan Hyundai of South Korea on 9 December, with an assist from Aldo de Nigris in the 3–1 victory. In the match for third place against Al Ahly on 16 December, Corona scored in the third minute of the match, which ended in a 2–0 victory.

Twente
On 22 August 2013, it was announced that Corona was transferred to Dutch side F.C. Twente, for whom he signed a four-year contract. He started the 2014 season with Twente's reserve team, which plays in the Second Division, scoring 2 goals on 18 August. On 13 September 2014, Corona returned from injury and a stint with the reserve team to start his first game with Twente in the 2014–15 season and went on to record an assist and a goal against Go Ahead Eagles in a 2–1 victory for Twente, the club's first victory of the 2014–15 Season. He finished his second season with the senior team with a career-best of 9 goals.

Porto

On 31 August 2015, Twente announced the transfer of Corona to Portuguese club Porto on a four-year deal for €10.5 million, with a €50 million buy-out clause.

On 12 September, Corona scored two goals on his Primeira Liga debut in the 3–1 victory over FC Arouca. On 25 September, Corona scored his third goal playing against Moreirense giving Porto the 2–1 lead, the match resulted in 2–2 draw. On 4 October, Corona scored Porto's first goal against Belenenses in a match that ended in a 4–0 win over the Lisbon team.

On 24 October 2018, Corona scored a goal and assisted another in Porto's 3–1 win over Lokomotiv Moscow in their Champions League group stage match. On 28 November 2018, in a Champions League group stage match against German club Schalke 04, Corona scored in a 3–1 victory, becoming the first Mexican to score in three consecutive Champions League matches. In March 2019, Corona signed a contract extension with Porto, keeping him at the club until 2022.

On 10 January 2020, in a league match against Moreirense, he scored from a volley in Porto's 4–2 victory. The goal was subsequently named Goal of the Month. At the end of the 2019–20 season, after a first-place finish and contributing a career-best 11 assists (2nd place for most of the season), Corona was named the best player of the Primeira Liga, and was included in the Best XI. He also won the club's Dragão de Ouro Award, which is awarded to the best player of the season.

Following a 1–1 draw against archrivals Benfica on 15 January 2021, Corona, in his 246th overall display, moved up to fourth in Porto's all-time list of foreign players with the most appearances, as well as becoming the Mexican with the most appearances in Portugal, surpassing former teammate Héctor Herrera.

Sevilla
On 13 January 2022, Corona joined La Liga side Sevilla on a three-and-a-half year deal. On 18 August 2022, he suffered a major injury in training. The player underwent surgery and is expected to be out of action between four and five months.

International career

Youth
Corona began his national team career with the under-20 side, participating in the 2011 and 2012 editions of the Milk Cup. Mexico won the 2012 final against Denmark, with Corona being named as the competition's best player.

Corona was called up by coach Sergio Almaguer to participate in the 2013 CONCACAF U-20 Championship hosted in Mexico. Jesús played four out of five matches and scored three goals. In the final against the United States, Corona scored in the fourth minute of the match, and helped Mexico win the championship. He was a squad member at the 2013 FIFA U-20 World Cup hosted in Turkey. Corona was again selected by Almaguer, this time to participate in the 2013 Toulon Tournament.

Senior
In 2014, Corona was called up by Miguel Herrera to play with the senior national team in their November friendlies against the Netherlands and Belarus. On 12 November, he made his debut against the Dutch, coming on in the 61st minute and providing the assist for Carlos Vela's second goal in the 3–2 victory for El Tri at the Amsterdam Arena.

Corona was a member of Mexico's 2015 CONCACAF Gold Cup winning squad, scoring his first competitive international goal in the 3–1 win over Jamaica in the Final. He also received the Bright Future award. He was also included in the 2015 Copa América roster. In Mexico's first group stage match against Bolivia, which ended in a scoreless draw, Corona's performance earned him the Man of the Match award.

The following year, now under coach Juan Carlos Osorio, Corona earned a call-up to the Copa América Centenario. In the final group stage match against Venezuela, he replaced the injured Javier Aquino at the 18th minute and scored in the 80th minute in an eventual 1–1 draw. The result earned Mexico a first-place finish in Group C, and Corona's goal was subsequently named CONCACAF Goal of the Year.

In May 2018, Corona was named in Mexico's preliminary 28-man squad for the World Cup, and in June, was subsequently named in the final 23-man roster. He appeared as a substitute in the group stage matches against South Korea and Sweden.

In October 2022, Corona was named in Mexico's preliminary 31-man squad by manager Gerardo Martino for the World Cup, but did not make the final 26 due to an ankle injury.

Style of play
A creative winger capable of playing either flank, he is considered quick and agile, capable of dribbling past defenders, has excellent technique, and has an eye for a shot. He is comfortable playing with either foot, managing to develop the ability from a young age.

Under Porto manager Sérgio Conceição, Corona has been utilized at times as a full-back.

He has cited Cuauhtémoc Blanco as someone he idolized while growing up.

Personal life
Corona was given the nickname Tecatito during his early years at Monterrey. The name is a reference to the beer brand Tecate, which was owned by club sponsor Cuauhtémoc Moctezuma Brewery, a competitor to the Corona beer brand that matches his surname. As a sponsor, the logo of another of its subsidiaries, Carta Blanca, was on the kits. During Monterrey's participation at the 2012 FIFA Club World Cup, with Carta Blanca as the sole kit sponsor, the name 'Corona' was not displayed, but instead 'Jesús C.' was printed on the kit.

Corona was naturalised as a Portuguese citizen in August 2021, allowing him to play freely for any team in the European Union.

Career statistics

Club

International

Scores and results list Mexico's goal tally first, score column indicates score after each Corona goal.

Honours
Monterrey
Mexican Primera División: Apertura 2010
CONCACAF Champions League: 2010–11, 2011–12, 2012–13

Porto
Primeira Liga: 2017–18, 2019–20, 2021–22
Taça de Portugal: 2019–20, 2021–22
Supertaça Cândido de Oliveira: 2018, 2020

Mexico U20
Milk Cup: 2012
CONCACAF U-20 Championship: 2013

Mexico
CONCACAF Gold Cup: 2015
CONCACAF Cup: 2015

Individual
Milk Cup Best Player: 2012
CONCACAF Gold Cup Best Young Player: 2015
CONCACAF Best XI: 2015, 2021
CONCACAF Goal of the Year: 2016
Primeira Liga Goal of the Month: January 2020
Primeira Liga Player of the Year: 2019–20
Primeira Liga Team of the Year: 2019–20
FC Porto Player of the Year: 2019–20

References

External links

Profile at the Sevilla FC website

Living people
1993 births
Sportspeople from Hermosillo
Mexican footballers
Footballers from Sonora
Association football wingers
Mexico international footballers
Mexico youth international footballers
Copa América Centenario players
CONCACAF Gold Cup-winning players
2015 Copa América players
2015 CONCACAF Gold Cup players
2018 FIFA World Cup players
2021 CONCACAF Gold Cup players
Liga MX players
Tercera División de México players
C.F. Monterrey players
Eredivisie players
Eerste Divisie players
FC Twente players
Primeira Liga players
FC Porto players
La Liga players
Sevilla FC players
Mexican expatriate footballers
Mexican expatriate sportspeople in the Netherlands
Mexican expatriate sportspeople in Spain
Expatriate footballers in the Netherlands
Expatriate footballers in Portugal
Expatriate footballers in Spain
Naturalised citizens of Portugal
Jong FC Twente players